Miles Gillespie Jones (born 1983) is a Canadian hip hop/soul musician.  Miles founded Mojo Records and Publishing in 2004 to provide an outlet for artists, producers and DJs to produce and publish audio works.  Miles career began with a solo album he released in 2006 release which was his University thesis project titled One Chance. In 2009, he followed up with Hip Hop second album titled, Runaway Jones, which landed placements on CSI Las Vegas, ABC's Rookie Blue and CTV's 2010 Olympic games soundtrack of the nation.

Discography 
General Consensus Volumes 1–3
2005: Mike Ford – Canada Needs You (Production)
2006: One Chance
2007: DJ Wristpect – Bridging the Gap Volume 2 Toronto to Chicago
2009: Never Too Late (Single) Produced by Black Milk
2009: Runaway Jones (Canada)- (URBNET/Fontana/Universal)
2010: Never Wrong (Single) (US) – (MB3/Caroline)
2011: Time Machine (Single) (US) – (URBNET/Mojo)
2011: Runaway Jones (US) – (Foundation/Mojo)
2011: Catch Me in the Rye  – (Foundation/Mojo)
2012: Act So Strange (EP)
2012: All Lies (Single)
2012: Maybe Tomorrow (Single)
2012: The Jones Act Part III (URBNET/Foundation/Mojo)

Videos 
No More feat. Marinda – 2012 – Director: Aaron Alleyne
Time Machine – 2011 – Director: Sean Harvey
Never Wrong (Remix) – 2011 – Director: Aaron Alleyne
Rhyme Like This feat. Percee P – 2010 – Director: Isaac Cravit
Trust Me feat. RaSoul – 2010 – Director: Michael Kane

Awards 
2007 Ontario Independent Music Awards Hip Hop Artist of the Year
Winner of 9th Annual Independent Music Awards (IMA): Rap/Hip-Hop song "Coast to Coast".
Nominated for 2009 Indie Awards: Favourite Hip Hop Artist
Winner of the 2010 Billboard World Song Contest : Rap/Hip-Hop song "Coast to Coast".
Winner of The 10th Annual Independent Music Awards in the Rap/Hip-Hop Song category for "Time Machine".

Licensing 
 "Coast To Coast" – CTV Olympic Broadcast – 2010
 "Coast To Coast" – CSI: Las Vegas – Season 10 (CBS)
 "Baby Boy" – Degrassi
 "Again" – The Best Years 2
 "The Boom Boom" – Degrassi
"Pumps and Polos" LA Complex (2012)
"Coast to Coast" Rookie Blue -ABC (2012)

References

External links 
 Miles Jones Website
 Miles Jones on Twitter
 Miles Jones on Facebook
 Miles Jones on YouTube
 Miles Jones on Myspace

1983 births
Living people
Black Canadian musicians
Canadian male rappers
21st-century Canadian rappers
Canadian hip hop singers
Independent Music Awards winners
Musicians from Toronto
21st-century Canadian male musicians
Place of birth missing (living people)

es:Miles Jones
fr:Miles Jones